The rank of lieutenant in Eastern Europe is one used in Slavophone armed forces. Depending on the country, it is either the lowest or second lowest officer rank.

Etymology 

Normally the  received military orders in written form and was responsible to meet the particular goals and objectives anticipated.

Russian imperial armed forces 

The Imperial Russian Army introduced this rank first in middle of the 17th century, by the Strelets so-called New Order Regiments , reflected in the Table of Ranks. A poruchik was normally assigned to assistant commanding officer of a company, later platoon. In 1798 this particular rank designation was replaced by lieutenant beginning with the Russian Guards, followed by other military units, and legalised by the Table of Ranks.

Lieutenant (Eastern Europe)'s insignia

See also 
 Podporuchik
 Lieutenant
 Lieutenant colonel (Eastern Europe)
 Colonel (Eastern Europe)
 Lieutenant colonel general
 Comparative army officer ranks of Europe
 Ranks and insignia of the Russian armed forces until 1917

References 

Military ranks of Poland
Military ranks of Russia
Military ranks of the Soviet Union

hr:Poručnik